Ode to 52nd Street is an album by guitarist Kenny Burrell recorded in 1967 and released on the Cadet label.

Reception

Allmusic awarded the album 3 stars in a review by Scott Yanow that stated "Burrell plays quite well, as usual (he is among the most consistent of jazz improvisers), and, even if the music is not all that memorable, the results are pleasing".

Track listing 
All compositions by Kenny Burrell and Richard Evans except as indicated
 "Suite for Guitar and Orchestra Theme 1: So Little Time" - 5:05     
 "Suite for Guitar and Orchestra Theme 2: Growing" - 4:12     
 "Suite for Guitar and Orchestra Theme 3: Round and Round We Go" - 5:28     
 "Suite for Guitar and Orchestra Theme 4: Recapitulation" - 2:58     
 "I Want My Baby Back" - 3:00     
 "Con Alma" (Dizzy Gillespie) - 3:29     
 "Soulero" (Evans) - 3:02     
 "Wild Is the Wind" (Dimitri Tiomkin, Ned Washington) - 3:09     
 "Blues Fuse" - 3:21

Personnel 
Kenny Burrell - guitar
Orchestra arranged and conducted by Richard Evans

References 

Kenny Burrell albums
1967 albums
Cadet Records albums